Yohan Di Tommaso (born 9 July 1983) is a French professional footballer who plays as a forward. He played at professional level in Ligue 2 for FC Rouen.

He is the younger brother of David Di Tommaso, a footballer who died in 2005 at the age of 26.

His father Pascal Di Tommaso and uncle Louis Di Tommaso both played in Ligue 2 for Grenoble Foot 38 in the 1980s.

References
 Yohan Di Tommaso career statistics at FootballDatabase.eu
 Yohan Di Tommaso profile at foot-national.com

1983 births
Living people
Association football forwards
French footballers
Ligue 2 players
Olympique Lyonnais players
FC Rouen players
Nîmes Olympique players
FC Martigues players
ÉFC Fréjus Saint-Raphaël players
Thonon Evian Grand Genève F.C. players
SC Toulon players
Lyon La Duchère players
Football Bourg-en-Bresse Péronnas 01 players
AS Saint-Priest players
People from Échirolles
Sportspeople from Isère
Footballers from Auvergne-Rhône-Alpes